The 1992–93 League of Ireland Premier Division was the 8th season of the League of Ireland Premier Division. The division was made up of 12 teams. With a team that included Phil Harrington, John Caulfield, Pat Morley, Paul Bannon, Gerry McCabe and Dave Barry, manager Noel O'Mahony guided Cork City to their first Premier Division title after a series of three-way play-offs that also involved Bohemians and Shelbourne.

Regular season
The regular season initially saw the 12 teams use a traditional round-robin format with each team playing 22 games on a home and away basis. The division was then split into two groups, a top six and a bottom six. After the split, the six teams played the other teams in their group in a second series of 10 games again using a round-robin format. On the last day of the regular season, Bohemians only needed to draw away to Dundalk to secure the title as they had a two-point advantage over both Shelbourne and Cork City. However Bohemians lost 1–0. Earlier in the day Shelbourne had defeated Derry City 1–0 with a goal in the last minute by Paul Doolin and Cork City beat Limerick 3–0. As a result, all three teams finished level on 40 points. Bohemians actually finished the season with the best goal difference, but at the time League of Ireland rules  stated that the title could not be won on goal difference and a play-off would be required.

Final table

Results

Matches 1–22

Matches 23–32

Top Six

Bottom Six

Promotion/relegation play-off
This season saw the introduction of a promotion/relegation play-off. Waterford United F.C. who finished in tenth place played off against Monaghan United F.C., the third placed team from the 1992–93 League of Ireland First Division.

1st leg

2nd leg

Monaghan United F.C. won 5–2 on aggregate and are promoted to Premier Division

Championship play-offs

First series
In the round-robin three way play-off, Cork City beat Bohemians at home, Bohemians beat Shelbourne at home and Shelbourne beat Cork City at home. The return fixtures were all drawn. Once again all three teams finished level on points and a second series of play-offs would be required.

First series table

Second series
The second series of play-offs saw the three teams playing each other once at neutral venues. During the break between the first and second series of play-offs, Shelbourne won the 1992–93 FAI Cup final and as a result qualified for 1993–94 European Cup Winners' Cup. Cork City clinched the title after defeating Shelbourne 3–2 in the deciding game at the RDS Arena.

Second series table

See also
 1992–93 League of Ireland First Division

References

Ireland
1992–93 in Republic of Ireland association football
League of Ireland Premier Division seasons